Carl Antony Crafar (born 18 November 1964, in Wanganui) is a former New Zealand cricketer who played for the Central Districts Stags in the 1986–87. He also played for Wanganui in the Hawke Cup.

References

1964 births
Living people
New Zealand cricketers
Central Districts cricketers